Liverpool 1 is a British television drama series centred on the work of a fictional Merseyside Police vice squad. Produced by Lime Street Productions for ITV, it starred Samantha Janus and Mark Womack and ran for two series from 7 September 1998 and 25 October 1999. The series represented an early vehicle for Janus' move into mainstream drama roles, following her success in the situation comedy Game On. Despite excellent viewing figures (which never dropped below 6.88m), ITV chose not to re-commission the show after series two. Repeats are intermittently shown on ITV3. The complete series was released on DVD for the first time on 15 August 2016.

Plot
Liverpool 1 focuses on Detective Constable Isobel De Pauli (Samantha Janus), a successful Metropolitan Police detective. Her boyfriend’s career move to Liverpool in turn sees De Pauli transferred there, and given a job within the Bridewell Vice Squad, under the control of Chief Inspector Graham Hill (Eamon Boland), and overseen by DI Howard Jones (Tom Georgeson). Upon arrival, she is partnered with introverted DC Mark Callaghan (Mark Womack), a no-nonsense officer brought up on the streets of the city he now polices. De Pauli initially takes a disliking to Callaghan, after discovering that he was responsible for throwing a suspect from an apartment window, which is depicted in the opening sequence of the first episode, "Fresh Meat". However, as her relationship with boyfriend Will Timmer (Tristan Sturrock) collapses, De Pauli grows closer and closer to Callaghan, and becomes friends with his sister, Julie (Gillian Kearney), eventually becoming her lodger. De Pauli shows initial disdain for her new colleagues, but continually grows to like and become good friends with them as time goes on.

A number of events occur during the first series which depict the true identity of each character. DC Frank White (Paul Broughton) is depicted as a womaniser and all-round layabout, a decision which comes to haunt him when he places De Pauli's life in danger during a surveillance op in "Pipe Dreams", where he leaves his post to engage in sexual relations with the owner whose flat is being used as the OP. DC Jo McMullen (Katy Carmichael) is depicted as somewhat of an "ice queen", and immediately causes tension between herself and De Pauli. In "Death By Misadventure", the pair finally come to blows - but the subsequent fallout leads to somewhat of an epiphany for the pair. Callaghan is depicted as having somewhat broken relationships with a number of his siblings. The relationship with his brother, drug-addicted Patrick (Scot Williams), is fractured further when he forces Patrick to become an informant, which results in him being shot by a gang of drug dealers, leaving him with only one leg. His relationship with his sister, Julie, isn't much better. His older brother, Ian (Andrew Lancel), a priest for the Catholic church, also holds him in low respect. The first series also centres on the initial personality clash between De Pauli and Callaghan.

John Sullivan (Paul Usher), is the main antagonist of the series. The ongoing saga of the squad's pursuit of him over his dodgy business dealings, doubled with the fact that is none other than Callaghan's cousin, makes for a complex interweb of events which sees him turn from criminal mastermind to supergrass. It is also revealed that Callaghan previously had a relationship with Sullivan's wife, Sue, before they got together. Callaghan's difficult relationship with Sullivan is a recurring theme throughout the series. The interconnectedness of the city and its patrons results in several minor characters making more than once appearance in the series, including DS Christian Tomaszewski, who is introduced in "Nine Till Five" as an out-of-town detective investigating drug dealer O'Brien, who the squad also have in their sights. Tomaszewski then becomes a recurring character throughout the remainder of the series. One of the main relationships featured in the series, between De Pauli and Callaghan, later re-enacted itself in real life, as Janus and Womack began a relationship during the filming of the series. They have since had two children, Benjamin and Lily-Rose, and on 17 May 2009 the pair were married.

Cast
 Samantha Janus as DC Isobel De Pauli, Vice Squad detective
 Mark Womack as DC Mark Callaghan, Vice Squad detective
 Tom Georgeson as DI Howard Jones, Vice Squad chief
 Paul Broughton as DC Frank White, Vice Squad detective
 Katy Carmichael as DC/Acting DS Jo McMullen, Vice Squad detective
 Eamon Boland as Chief Inspector Graham Hill, Head of division
 Paul Usher as John Sullivan, local gangland criminal and drug dealer
 Scot Williams as Patrick Callaghan, Mark's drug-addicted brother
 Andrew Lancel as Ian Callaghan, Mark's brother
 Gillian Kearney as Joanne spain, Dave's wife
 Simon O'Brien as DS Christian Tomaszewski, detective (Series 2, episodes 3—6)
 Stephen Walters as Mikey Sullivan (Series 1, Episode 1)

Episode list

Series 1 (1998)

Series 2 (1999)

References

External links 
 

1998 British television series debuts
1999 British television series endings
1990s British crime drama television series
1990s British police procedural television series
1990s British workplace drama television series
British detective television series
English-language television shows
ITV crime dramas
Television shows set in Liverpool
Television shows shot in Liverpool